The Judo Competition at the 2003 Pan American Games was held from August 1 to August 17, 2003 in Santo Domingo, Dominican Republic. There were seven weight divisions, for both men and women. Cuba dominated the women's competition.

Medal table

Men's competition

Extra-Lightweight (– 60 kg)

Half-Lightweight (– 66 kg)

Lightweight (– 73 kg)

Half-Middleweight (– 81 kg)

Middleweight (– 90 kg)

Half-Heavyweight (– 100 kg)

Heavyweight (+ 100 kg)

Women's competition

Extra-Lightweight (– 48 kg)

Half-Lightweight (– 52 kg)

Lightweight (– 57 kg)

Half-Middleweight (– 63 kg)

Middleweight (– 70 kg)

Half-Heavyweight (– 78 kg)

Heavyweight (+ 78 kg)

References

External links
 
 Sports 123

American Games
2003
Events at the 2003 Pan American Games
Judo competitions in the Dominican Republic
International sports competitions hosted by the Dominican Republic